Chad Leonhardt (born February 19, 1980) is an American mixed martial artist who fought for Strikeforce and Bellator Fighting Championships.

MMA career

Bellator Fighting Championships
Leonhardt made his debut on May 9, 2009 at Bellator 9 against Dan Keenan. He won via KO in the first round.

Leonhardt faced Kelly Leo on March 12, 2011 at Bellator 36. He won by corner stoppage at the end of the second round.

Strikeforce
Leonhardt made his debut on August 12, 2011 at Strikeforce Challengers: Gurgel vs. Duarte against Mike Bronzoulis. He lost via TKO in the third round.

Mixed martial arts record

|-
| Loss
| align=center| 9–4
| Matt Foster
| Submission
| Horsepower Promotions - Fists of Fury 2
| 
| align=center| 1
| align=center| 1:52
| Lawton, Oklahoma, United States
| 
|-
| Loss
| align=center| 9–3
| Mike Bronzoulis
| TKO (leg kick and punches)
| Strikeforce Challengers: Gurgel vs. Duarte
| 
| align=center| 3
| align=center| 1:30
| Las Vegas, Nevada, United States
| 
|-
| Win
| align=center| 9–2
| Kelly Leo
| TKO (corner stoppage)
| Bellator 36
| 
| align=center| 2
| align=center| 5:00
| Shreveport, Louisiana, United States
| 
|-
| Win
| align=center| 8–2
| Bill Albrecht
| TKO (punches)
| RAD - Rumble at Diamondjacks
| 
| align=center| 1
| align=center| 0:11
| Shreveport, Louisiana, United States
| 
|-
| Win
| align=center| 7–2
| Stephen Adkisson
| KO (punch)
| Superbrawl 6 - Rampage at The Riverfront
| 
| align=center| 1
| align=center| 0:45
| Alexandria, Louisiana, United States
| 
|-
| Loss
| align=center| 6–2
| Joey Gorczynski
| Submission (guillotine choke)
| FCF - Freestyle Cage Fighting 38
| 
| align=center| 1
| align=center| 2:27
| Tulsa, Oklahoma, United States
| 
|-
| Win
| align=center| 6–1
| Corey Holder
| TKO (punches)
| CK - Breaking Point
| 
| align=center| 1
| align=center| 1:43
| Bossier City, Louisiana, United States
| 
|-
| Win
| align=center| 5–1
| Victor Rackliff
| Decision (unanimous)
| Cage Kings - Victory at the Riverdome
| 
| align=center| 3
| align=center| 5:00
| Shreveport, Louisiana, United States
| 
|-
| Win
| align=center| 4–1
| Dan Keenan
| KO (knee)
| Bellator 9
| 
| align=center| 1
| align=center| 3:03
| Monroe, Louisiana, United States
| 
|-
| Win
| align=center| 3–1
| Chris Cichy
| TKO (punches)
| RR - Ring Rulers
| 
| align=center| 1
| align=center| 1:18
| Lawton, Oklahoma, United States
| 
|-
| Win
| align=center| 2–1
| Cale Grady
| TKO (punches)
| Cage Kings - Total Domination
| 
| align=center| 2
| align=center| 2:20
| Bossier City, Louisiana, United States
| 
|-
| Win
| align=center| 1–1
| Jewel Scott
| Decision (unanimous)
| Ring Rulers - Super Brawl
| 
| align=center| 3
| align=center| 5:00
| Alexandria, Louisiana, United States
| 
|-
| Loss
| align=center| 0–1
| Tony Hunter
| Submission (rear-naked choke)
| CK - Destruction at the Dome
| 
| align=center| 1
| align=center| 0:56
| Bossier City, Louisiana, United States
|

References

1980 births
Living people
Welterweight mixed martial artists
Place of birth missing (living people)
American male mixed martial artists
Sportspeople from Shreveport, Louisiana